is a city in Kanagawa Prefecture, Japan.

Kamakura was designated as a city on 3 November 1939.

Kamakura was the de facto capital of Japan from 1185 to 1333 as the seat of the Kamakura shogunate, and became the nation's most populous settlement during the Kamakura period. Kamakura is a popular domestic tourist destination in Japan as a coastal city with a high number of seasonal festivals, as well as ancient Buddhist and Shinto shrines and temples.

Geography 

Surrounded to the north, east, and west by hills and to the south by the open water of Sagami Bay, Kamakura is a natural fortress. The natural fortification made Kamakura an easily defensible stronghold.

Before the opening of the Entrances, access on land was so difficult that the Azuma Kagami reports that Hōjō Masako came back to Kamakura from a visit to Sōtōzan temple in Izu bypassing by boat the impassable Inamuragasaki cape and arriving in Yuigahama. Again according to the Azuma Kagami, the first of the Kamakura , Minamoto no Yoritomo, chose it as a base partly because it was his ancestors' land (his ), partly because of these physical characteristics.

To the north of the city stands , which then passes behind the Daibutsu and reaches Inamuragasaki and the sea.

From Kamakura's alluvional plain branch off numerous narrow valleys like the Urigayatsu, Shakadōgayatsu, Ōgigayatsu, Kamegayatsu, Hikigayatsu, and Matsubagayatsu valleys.

The river marks the border between Zaimokuza and Yuigahama.

In administrative terms, the municipality of Kamakura borders with Yokohama to the north, with Zushi to the east, and with Fujisawa to the west. It includes many areas outside the Seven Entrances as Yamanouchi, Shichirigahama, and Ofuna, and is the result of the fusion of Kamakura proper with the cities of Koshigoe, absorbed in 1939, Ofuna, absorbed in 1948, and with the village of Fukasawa, absorbed in 1948.

Kita-Kamakura (Yamanouchi) 

Northwest of Kamakura lies Yamanouchi, commonly called Kita-Kamakura because of the presence of East Japan Railway Company's (JR) Kita-Kamakura Station. Yamanouchi, however, was technically never a part of historical Kamakura since it is outside the Seven Entrances. Yamanouchi was the northern border of the city during the shogunate, and the important Kobukorozaka and Kamegayatsu Passes, two of Kamakura's Seven Entrances, led directly to it. Its name at the time used to be . The border post used to lie about a hundred meters past today's Kita-Kamakura train station in Ofuna's direction.

These three great temples were built here because Yamanouchi was the home territory of the Hōjō clan, a branch of the Taira clan which ruled Japan for 150 years. Among Kita-Kamakura's most illustrious citizens were artist Isamu Noguchi and movie director Yasujirō Ozu. Ozu is buried at Engaku-ji.

Wakamiya Ōji and the shogunate's six avenues 

Kamakura's defining feature is Tsurugaoka Hachiman-gū, a Shinto shrine in the center of the city. A   runs from Sagami Bay directly to the shrine. This road is known as Wakamiya Ōji, the city's main street. Built by Minamoto no Yoritomo as an imitation of Kyoto's Suzaku Ōji, Wakamiya Ōji used to be much wider, delimited on both sides by a  canal and flanked by pine trees.

Between the first and the second lies Geba Yotsukado which, as the name indicates, was the place where riders had to get off their horses in deference to Hachiman and his shrine.

The  becomes gradually wider, giving the effect of looking longer than it really is when viewed from the shrine. Its entire length is under the direct administration of the shrine. Minamoto no Yoritomo made his father-in-law Hōjō Tokimasa and his men carry by hand the stones to build it to pray for the safe delivery of his son Yoriie. The  used to go all the way to Geba, but it was drastically shortened during the 19th century to make way for the newly constructed Yokosuka railroad line.

Komachi Ōji and Ima Kōji run respectively east and west of Wakamiya Ōji, while Yoko Ōji, the road that passes right under , and Ōmachi Ōji, which goes from Kotsubo to Geba and Hase, run in the east–west direction. Near the remains of Hama no Ōtorii runs Kuruma Ōji Avenue (also called Biwa Koji). These six streets (three running north to south and three east to west) were built at the time of the shogunate and are all still under heavy use. The only one to have been modified is Kuruma Ōji, a segment of which has disappeared.

History

Early history 
The earliest traces of human settlements in the area date back at least 10,000 years. Obsidian and stone tools found at excavation sites near  were dated to the Old Stone Age (between 100,000 and 10,000 years ago). During the Jōmon period, the sea level was higher than now and all the flat land in Kamakura up to Tsurugaoka Hachiman-gū and, further east, up to Yokohama's Totsuka-ku and Sakae-ku was under water. Thus, the oldest pottery fragments found come from hillside settlements of the period between 7500 BC and 5000 BC. In the late Jōmon period the sea receded and civilization progressed. During the Yayoi period (300 BC–300 AD), the sea receded further almost to today's coastline, and the economy shifted radically from hunting and fishing to farming.

The Azuma Kagami describes pre-shogunate Kamakura as a remote, forlorn place, but there is reason to believe its writers simply wanted to give the impression that prosperity had been brought there by the new regime. To the contrary, it is known that by the Nara period (about 700 AD) there were both temples and shrines. Sugimoto-dera for example was built during this period and is therefore one of the city's oldest temples. The town was also the seat of area government offices and the point of convergence of several land and marine routes. It seems therefore only natural that it should have been a city of a certain importance, likely to attract Yoritomo's attention.

Etymology 
However, the city clearly appears in the historical record only with Minamoto no Yoritomo's founding of the Kamakura shogunate in 1192.

There are various hypotheses about the origin of the name.

Another and more picturesque explanation is a legend, relating how Fujiwara no Kamatari stopped at Yuigahama on his way to today's Ibaraki Prefecture, where he wanted to pray at the Kashima Shrine for the fall of Soga no Iruka. Kamatari enshrined it in a place called Ōkura. Kamayari plus Ōkura then turned into the name Kamakura. However, this and similar legends appear to have arisen only after Kamatari's descendant Fujiwara no Yoritsune became the fourth  of the Kamakura shogunate in 1226, some time after the name Kamakura appears in the historical record. It used to be also called  (short for ).

Kamakura period

The extraordinary events, the historical characters and the culture of the twenty years which go from Minamoto no Yoritomo's birth to the assassination of the last of his sons have been throughout Japanese history the background and the inspiration for countless poems, books,  TV dramas, Kabuki plays, songs, manga and even videogames; and are necessary to make sense of much of what one sees in today's Kamakura.

Yoritomo, after the defeat and almost complete extermination of his family at the hands of the Taira clan, managed in the space of a few years to go from being a fugitive hiding from his enemies inside a tree trunk to being the most powerful man in the land. Defeating the Taira clan, Yoritomo became de facto ruler of much of Japan and founder of the Kamakura shogunate, an institution destined to last 141 years and to have immense repercussions over the country's history.

The Kamakura shogunate era is called by historians the Kamakura period and, although its end is clearly set (Siege of Kamakura (1333)), its beginning is not. It used to be thought that during this period, effective power had moved completely from the Emperor in Kyoto to Yoritomo in Kamakura, but the progress of research has revealed this was not the case. Even after the consolidation of the shogunate's power in the east, the Emperor continued to rule the country, particularly its west. However, it is undeniable that Kamakura had a certain autonomy and that it had surpassed the technical capital of Japan politically, culturally and economically. The shogunate even reserved for itself an area in Kyoto called  where lived its representatives, who were there to protect its interests.

In 1179, Yoritomo married Hōjō Masako, an event of far-reaching consequences for Japan. In 1180, he entered Kamakura, building his residence in a valley called Ōkura (in today's Nishi Mikado). The stele on the spot reads:

Yoshitsune's power would however cause Yoritomo's envy; the relationship between the brothers soured, and in 1189 Yoritomo was given Yoshitsune's head pickled in liquor. For the same reason, in 1193 he had his other brother Noriyori killed. Power was now firmly in his hands, but the Minamoto dynasty and its power however were to end as quickly and unexpectedly as they had started.

In 1199, Yoritomo died falling from his horse at the age of 51, and was buried in a temple that had until then housed his tutelary goddess. He was succeeded by his 17-year-old son Minamoto no Yoriie under the regency of his maternal grandfather Hōjō Tokimasa. A long and bitter fight ensued in which entire clans like the Hatakeyama, the Hiki, and the Wada were wiped out by the Hōjō who wished to get rid of Yoritomo's supporters and consolidate their power. Yoriie did become head of the Minamoto clan and was regularly appointed  in 1202 but by that time, real power had already fallen into the hands of the Hōjō clan. Yoriie plotted to take back his power, but failed and was assassinated on July 17, 1204. His six-year-old first son Ichiman had already been killed during political turmoil in Kamakura, while his second son Yoshinari at age six was forced to become a Buddhist priest under the name Kugyō. From then on all power would belong to the Hōjō, and the  would be just a figurehead. Since the Hōjō were part of the Taira clan, it can be said that the Taira had lost a battle, but in the end had won the war.

Yoritomo's second son and third  Minamoto no Sanetomo spent most of his life staying out of politics and writing poetry, but was nonetheless assassinated in February 1219 by his nephew Kugyō under the giant ginkgo tree whose trunk still stood at Tsurugaoka Hachiman-gū until it was uprooted by a storm in the early hours of March 10, 2010. Kugyō himself, the last of his line, was beheaded as a punishment for his crime by the Hōjō just hours later. Barely 30 years into the shogunate, the Seiwa Genji dynasty who had created it in Kamakura had ended.

In 1293, a severe earthquake killed 23,000 people and seriously damaged the city. In the confusion following the quake, Hōjō Sadatoki, the Shikken of the Kamakura shogunate, carried out a purge against his subordinate Taira no Yoritsuna. In what is referred to as the Heizen Gate Incident, Yoritsuna and 90 of his followers were killed.

The Hōjō regency however continued until Nitta Yoshisada destroyed it in 1333 at the Siege of Kamakura. It was under the regency that Kamakura acquired many of its best and most prestigious temples and shrines, for example Tsurugaoka Hachiman-gū, Kenchō-ji, Engaku-ji, Jufuku-ji, Jōchi-ji, and Zeniarai Benten Shrine. The Hōjō family crest in the city is therefore still ubiquitous.

From the middle of the thirteenth century, the fact that the vassals (the ) were allowed to become de facto owners of the land they administered, coupled to the custom that all  children could inherit, led to the parcelization of the land and to a consequent weakening of the shogunate. This, and not lack of legitimacy, was the primary cause of the Hōjō's fall.

According to The Institute for Research on World-Systems, Kamakura was the 4th largest city in the world in 1250 AD, with 200,000 people, and Japan's largest, eclipsing Kyoto by 1200 AD. Yet, despite Kamakura's annihilation of Kyoto-based political and military power at the Battle of Dan-no-ura in 1185, and the failure of the Emperor to free himself from Kamakura's control during the Jōkyū War, Takahashi (2005) has questioned whether Kamakura's nationwide political hegemony actually existed. Takahashi claims that if Kamakura ruled the Kantō, not only was the Emperor in fact still the ruler of Kansai, but during this period the city was in many ways politically and administratively still under the ancient capital of Kyoto. Kamakura was simply a rival center of political, economic and cultural power in a country that had Kyoto as its capital.

Fall of the Kamakura shogunate

On July 3, 1333, warlord Nitta Yoshisada, who was an Emperor loyalist, attacked Kamakura to reestablish imperial rule. After trying to enter by land through the Kewaizaka Pass and the Gokuraku-ji Pass, he and his forces waited for a low tide, bypassed the Inamuragasaki cape, entered the city and took it.

In accounts of that disastrous Hōjō defeat it is recorded that nearly 900 Hōjō samurai, including the last three Regents, committed suicide at their family temple, Tōshō-ji, whose ruins have been found in today's Ōmachi. Almost the entire clan vanished at once, the city was sacked and many temples were burned. Many simple citizens imitated the Hōjō, and an estimated total of over 6,000 died on that day of their own hand. In 1953, 556 skeletons of that period were found during excavations near Tsurugaoka Hachiman-gū's Ichi no Torii in Yuigahama, all of people who had died of a violent death, probably at the hand of Nitta's forces.

Muromachi and Edo periods

The fall of Kamakura marks the beginning of an era in Japanese history characterized by chaos and violence called the Muromachi period. Kamakura's decline was slow, and in fact the next phase of its history, in which, as the capital of the Kantō region, it dominated the east of the country, lasted almost as long as the shogunate had. Kamakura would come out of it almost completely destroyed.

The situation in Kantō after 1333 continued to be tense, with Hōjō supporters staging sporadic revolts here and there. In 1335, Hōjō Tokiyuki, son of last regent Takatoki, tried to re-establish the shogunate by force and defeated Kamakura's de facto ruler Ashikaga Tadayoshi in Musashi, in today's Kanagawa Prefecture. He was in his turn defeated in Koshigoe by Ashikaga Takauji, who had come in force from Kyoto to help his brother.

Takauji, founder of the Ashikaga shogunate which, at least nominally, ruled Japan during the 14th, 15th and 16th centuries, at first established his residence at the same site in Kamakura where Yoritomo's  had been, but in 1336 he left Kamakura in charge of his son Yoshiakira and went west in pursuit of Nitta Yoshisada.

Motouji had been sent by his father because this last understood the importance of controlling the Kantō region and wanted to have an Ashikaga in power there, but the administration in Kamakura was from the beginning characterized by its rebelliousness, so the 's idea never really worked and actually backfired. The  era is essentially a struggle for the shogunate between the Kamakura and the Kyoto branches of the Ashikaga clan, because both believed they had a valid claim to power. In the end, Kamakura had to be retaken by force in 1454. The five  recorded by history, all of Motouji's bloodline, were in order Motouji himself, Ujimitsu, Mitsukane, Mochiuji and Shigeuji. According to the Shinpen Kamakurashi, a guide book published in 1685, more than two centuries later the spot where the 's mansion had been was still left empty by local peasants in the hope he may one day return.

A long period of chaos and war followed the departure of the last  (the Sengoku period). Kamakura was heavily damaged in 1454 and almost completely burned during the Siege of Kamakura (1526). Many of its citizens moved to Odawara when it came to prominence as the home town of the Later Hōjō clan. The final blow to the city was the decision taken in 1603 by the Tokugawa  to move the capital to nearby Edo, the place now called Tokyo. The city never recovered and gradually returned to be the small fishing village it had been before Yoritomo's arrival. Edmond Papinot's Historical and Geographical Dictionary of Japan, published in 1910 during the late Meiji period, describes it as follows:

Meiji period and the 20th century 
After the Meiji Restoration, Kamakura's great cultural assets, its beach, and the mystique that surrounded its name made it as popular as it is now, and for essentially the same reasons. The destruction of its heritage nonetheless did not stop: during the anti-Buddhist violence of 1868 that followed the official policy of separation of Shinto and Buddhism many of the city temples were damaged. In other cases, because mixing the two religions was now forbidden, shrines or temples had to give away some of their treasures, thus damaging their cultural heritage and decreasing the value of their properties. Tsurugaoka Hachiman-gū's giant  (the two wooden warden gods usually found at the sides of a Buddhist temple's entrance), for example, being objects of Buddhist worship and therefore illegal where they were, were brought to Jufuku-ji, where they still are.

The shrine also had to destroy Buddhism-related buildings, for example its  tower, its , and its .
 Some Buddhist temples were simply closed, like Zenkō-ji, to which the now-independent Meigetsu-in used to belong.

In 1890, the railroad, which until then had arrived just to Ofuna, reached Kamakura bringing in tourists and new residents, and with them a new prosperity. Part of the ancient Dankazura (see above) was removed to let the railway system's new Yokosuka Line pass.

The damage caused by time, centuries of neglect, politics, and modernization was further compounded by nature in 1923. The epicenter of the Great Kantō earthquake that year was deep beneath Izu Ōshima Island in Sagami Bay, a short distance from Kamakura. Tremors devastated Tokyo, the port city of Yokohama, and the surrounding prefectures of Chiba, Kanagawa, and Shizuoka, causing widespread damage throughout the Kantō region. It was reported that the sea receded at an unprecedented velocity, and then waves rushed back towards the shore in a great wall of water over seven meters high, drowning some and crushing others beneath an avalanche of waterborne debris. The total death toll from earthquake, tsunami, and fire exceeded 2,000 victims. Large sections of the shore simply slid into the sea; and the beach area near Kamakura was raised up about six-feet; or in other words, where there had only been a narrow strip of sand along the sea, a wide expanse of sand was fully exposed above the waterline.

Many temples founded centuries ago have required restoration, and it is for this reason that Kamakura has just one National Treasure in the building category (the Shariden at Engaku-ji). Much of Kamakura's heritage was for various reasons over the centuries first lost and later rebuilt.

Nichiren in Kamakura 

Kamakura is known among Buddhists for having been the cradle of Nichiren Buddhism during the 13th century. Founder Nichiren was not a native; he was born in Awa Province, in today's Chiba Prefecture. But it was only natural for a preacher to come here because the city was the political centre of the country at the time. Nichiren settled down in a straw hut in the Matsubagayatsu (literally ) district, where three temples (Ankokuron-ji, Myōhō–ji, and Chōshō-ji), have been fighting for centuries for the honour of being the true heir of the master. During his turbulent life Nichiren came and went, but Kamakura always remained at the heart of his religious activities. Kamakura is also where he preached.

Some Kamakura locations important to Nichiren Buddhism are:

 The three temples in Matsubagayatsu
Ankokuron-ji claims to have on its grounds the cave where the master, with the help of a white monkey, hid from his persecutors. (However Hosshō-ji in Zushi's Hisagi district makes the same claim, and with a better historical basis.) Within Ankokuron-ji lie also the spot where Nichiren used to meditate while admiring Mount Fuji, the place where his disciple Nichiro was cremated, and the cave where he is supposed to have written his . Nearby Myōhō–ji (also called Koke-dera or ), a much smaller temple, was erected in an area where Nichiren had his home for 19 years. The third Nichiren temple in Nagoe, Chōshō-ji, also claims to lie on the very spot where it all started.
 The  on Komachi Ōji in the Komachi district contains the very stone from which he used to harangue the crowds, claiming that the various calamities that were afflicting the city at the moment were due to the moral failings of its citizens.
 The former execution ground at Katase's Ryūkō-ji where Nichiren was about to be beheaded (an event known to Nichiren's followers as the ), and where he was miraculously saved when thunder struck the executioner. Every year, on September 12, Nichiren devotees gather to celebrate the anniversary of the miracle.
 The , the pine tree on the roads between Harisuribashi and Inamuragasaki from which Nichiren hanged his  (a Buddhist stole) while on his way to Ryūkō-ji. The original pine tree however died long ago and, after having been replaced many times, now no longer exists.

Notable locations

Kamakura has many historically significant Buddhist temples and Shinto shrines, some of them, like Sugimoto-dera, over 1,200 years old. Kōtoku-in, with its monumental outdoor bronze statue of Amida Buddha, is the most famous. A 15th-century tsunami destroyed the temple that once housed the Great Buddha, but the statue survived and has remained outdoors ever since. This iconic Daibutsu is arguably amongst the few images which have come to represent Japan in the world's collective imagination. Kamakura also hosts the so-called Five Great Zen Temples (the ).

The architectural heritage of Kamakura is almost unmatched, and the city has proposed some of its historic sites for inclusion in UNESCO's World Heritage Sites list. Although much of the city was devastated in the Great Kantō earthquake of 1923, damaged temples and shrines, founded centuries ago, have since been carefully restored.

Some of Kamakura's highlights are:

 The Asaina Pass and its Kumano Jinja
 Ankokuron-ji
 An'yō-in
 Chōju-ji, one of Ashikaga Takauji's two  (funeral temples)
 Engaku-ji, ranked Number Two among Kamakura's Great Zen Temples
 Hatakeyama Shigeyasu's grave
 Hōkai-ji, dedicated to the memory of the Hōjō clan
 Jōchi-ji, ranked Number Four among Kamakura's Great Zen Temples
 Jōmyō-ji temple, ranked Number Five among Kamakura's Great Zen Temples
 Jufuku-ji, ranked Number Three among Kamakura's Great Zen Temples
 Hase-dera
 Kamakura-gū in Nikaidō, built on the spot where Prince Morinaga, son of Emperor Go-Daigo, was imprisoned and then beheaded by Ashikaga Tadayoshi in 1335.
 The Kamakura Museum of Literature, the former villa of Marquises Maeda
 Kamakura Museum of National Treasures
 Kanagawa Prefectural Ofuna Botanical Garden
 Kenchō-ji, ranked Number One among Kamakura's Great Zen Temples and, together with Tsurugaoka Hachiman-gū, the pride of the city
 Kōmyō-ji
 Kōtoku-in and its Great Buddha
 Meigetsu-in
 Moto Hachiman
 Myōhon-ji
 Ōfuna Kannon
 Katase's Ryūkō-ji
 Sasuke Inari Shrine and Hidden Village
 The Shakadō Pass (see description below)
 Sugimoto-dera
 Tamanawa Castle, Castle ruins of Later Hōjō clan
 Tatsunokuchi, where Mongol emissaries were beheaded and buried.
 Tōkei-ji, famous in the past as a refuge for battered women
 Tomb of Minamoto no Yoritomo
 Tsurugaoka Hachiman-gū, symbol of the city
 Wakamiya Ōji Avenue with its three  and cherry trees
 Yuigahama, a popular beach
 Zeniarai Benzaiten Shrine, where visitors go to wash their coins
 Zuisen-ji, funeral temple of the Ashikaga , rulers in Kamakura during the early Muromachi period

Festivals and other events 

Kamakura has many festivals and other events in each of the seasons, usually based on its rich historical heritage. They are often sponsored by private businesses and, unlike those in Kyoto, they are relatively small-scale events attended mostly by locals and a few tourists. January in particular has many because it is the first month of the year, so authorities, fishermen, businesses and artisans organize events to pray for their own health and safety, and for a good and prosperous working year. Kamakura's numerous temples and shrines, first among them city symbols Tsurugaoka Hachiman-gū and Kenchō-ji, organize many events too, bringing the total to over a hundred.

January 
 January 4:  at Tsurugaoka Hachiman-gū: This event marks the beginning of the working year for local construction workers who, for the ceremony, use traditional working tools. The festival also commemorates Minamoto no Yoritomo, who ordered the reconstruction of the main building of the shrine after it was destroyed by fire in 1191. The ceremony takes place at 1:00pm at Tsurugaoka Hachiman-gū.

February 
 Day before the first day of spring (usually February 3):   at Tsurugaoka Hachiman-gū, Kenchō-ji, Hase-dera, Kamakura-gū, etc.: Celebration of the end of winter. Soybeans are scattered in the air to ensure good luck.

April 
2nd to 3rd Sunday:  at Tsurugaoka Hachiman-gū and other locations: A whole week of events that celebrate the city and its history.

May
 May 5:   at the Kamakura Shrine: Archers in samurai gear shoot arrows at a straw deer while reciting old poems.

August 
 August 10 (or following Monday if it falls on a Saturday): A full hour of fireworks on the beach in Yuigahama.

September 

Shakadō Pass 

Besides the Seven Entrances there is another great pass in the city, the huge , which connects Shakadōgayatsu to the Ōmachi and Nagoe (formerly called Nagoshi) districts.

According to the plaque near the pass itself, the name derives from the fact that third Shikken Hōjō Yasutoki built here a Shakadō (a Buddhist temple devoted to Shakyamuni) dedicated to his father Yoshitoki's memory. The original location of the temple is unclear, but it was closed some time in the middle Muromachi period. The Shaka Nyorai statue that is supposed to have been its main object of cult has been declared an Important Cultural Property and is conserved at Daien-ji in Meguro, Tokyo.

Although important, the pass was not considered one of the Entrances because it connected two areas both fully within Kamakura. Its date of creation is unclear, as it is not explicitly mentioned in any historical record, and it could be therefore recent. In any case, the presence of two  tombs within it means that it can be dated to at least the Kamakura period. It was then an important way of transit, but it was also much narrower than today and harder to pass.

On the Shakadōgayatsu side of the pass, just before the first houses a small street on the left takes to a large group of  called . There rest the bones of some of the hundreds of Hōjō family members who committed suicide at Tōshō-ji after the fall of Kamakura in 1333.

The pass is presently closed to all traffic because of the danger posed by falling rocks.

On April 28, 2010, a day of heavy rain, a large section of rock on the Omachi side of the Shakado Pass gave way, making the road temporarily impassable for pedestrians.

tombs 

An important and characteristic feature of Kamakura is a type of grave called .  are caves dug on the side of hills during the Middle Ages to serve as tombs for high-ranking personalities and priests.

Many are now abandoned and in a bad state of preservation.

The reason why they were dug is not known, but it is thought likely that the tradition started because of the lack of flat land within the narrow limits of Kamakura's territory. Started during the Kamakura period (1185–1333), the tradition seems to have declined during the following Muromachi period, when storehouses and cemeteries came to be preferred.

True  can be found also in the Miura Peninsula, in the Izu Peninsula, and even in distant Awa Province (Chiba).

Tombs in caves can also be found in the Tōhoku region, near Hiroshima and Kyoto, and in Ishikawa Prefecture, however they are not called  and their relationship with those in Kanagawa Prefecture is unknown.

Transportation

Rail
JR East's Yokosuka Line has three stations within the city. Ōfuna Station is the northernmost. Next is Kita-Kamakura Station. In the center of the city is Kamakura Station, the central railway station in the city.

Kamakura Station is the terminal for the Enoshima Electric Railway. This railway runs westward to Fujisawa, and part of its route runs parallel to the seashore. After leaving Kamakura Station, trains make eight more station stops in the city. One of them is Hase Station, closest to Hase-dera and Kōtoku-in.  The next station on the line is Gokurakuji Station, one of the settings for the 2014 film Our Little Sister.

Highway
 National Route 134

Education
Kamakura has many educational facilities. The city operates sixteen public elementary schools and nine middle schools. The national government has one elementary and one middle school, and there are two private elementary and six private middle schools. At the next level are four prefectural and six private high schools. Also in Kamakura is a prefectural special school.

Kamakura Women's University is the city's sole university.

Government and administration
Kamakura has a mayor and a city council, all publicly elected. The mayor is Takashi Matsuo. The City Council consists of 28 members.

Sister cities
Kamakura has six sister cities. Three are in Japan and three are overseas:

 Nice, France (1966)
 Ueda, Nagano, Japan (1979)
 Hagi, Yamaguchi, Japan (1979)
 Ashikaga, Tochigi, Japan (1982)
 Dunhuang, China (1998)
 Nashville, Tennessee, USA (2014)

loge
Kamakura has many historical houses. Tukikagetei is one of the famous houses. It had constructed 100 years ago in the Taisho era. But now,Fukagawa Geishauses this house for their lives.

Notes

Citations

General and cited references

 Hammer, Joshua (2006). Yokohama Burning: The Deadly 1923 Earthquake and Fire that Helped Forge the Path to World War II. New York: Simon & Schuster.  (cloth)

   
 Kamakura City's List of Festivals and Events 

 Kamakura Today: Annual Events

External links 

 Official Website 
 Kanagawa Official Tourism Website 
 

 
Cities in Kanagawa Prefecture
Populated coastal places in Japan